EF5 is a nitroimidazole derivative used in oncology research.  Due to its similarity in chemical structure to etanidazole, EF5 binds in cells displaying hypoxia.

Non-labeled EF5 has been extensively used in immunohistochemical studies for several years and its hypoxia specificity has been comprehensively evaluated The 18F-radiolabeled derivative of EF5 is being studied for its possibility to be used in positron emission tomography (PET) to detect low levels of oxygen in brain tumors and several other malignant tumors. This can help show how a tumor will respond to treatment.

Targeting tumor hypoxia in cancer treatment aims to overcome radiotherapy resistance of hypoxic tumors. Thus, a major clinical implication for 18F-EF5-PET imaging is expected to be guiding of radiotherapy dose modulation. Clinical studies on 18F-EF5-PET/CT imaging have indicated clinically acceptable biodistribution and dosimetric profile, and in head and neck cancer also favorable imaging characteristics, prognostic value and repeatability. A recent 18F-EF5-PET/MR study showed promising potential in detecting tumor hypoxia in cervical cancer. However, 18F-EF5-PET/CT is not feasible in imaging of ovarian cancer due to physiological intra-abdominal 18F-EF5-accumulation. Further studies evaluating the clinical use of 18F-EF5 PET imaging in head and neck cancer are ongoing.

References 

Nitroimidazoles